The 2021–22 Armenian Cup was the 31st edition of the football competition in Armenia. The competition began on 15 September 2021 and concluded on 8 May 2022 with Noravank winning their first title. Ararat Yerevan were the defending champions of the cup after defeating Alashkert in the previous season's final.

Teams

First round

Quarterfinals

Semi–finals

Final

Scorers

2 goals:

 Hugo Firmino - Pyunik
 Jonel Désiré - Urartu
 Ernist Batyrkanov - Van
 Temur Mustafin - Noravank

1 goals:

 Artyom Avanesyan - Ararat-Armenia
 Mailson Lima - Ararat-Armenia
 Yusuf Otubanjo - Ararat-Armenia
 Hovhannes Nazaryan - Ararat Yerevan
 Christian Ouguehi - Ararat Yerevan
 Artur Serobyan - BKMA Yerevan
 Matarr Badjie - Lernayin Artsakh
 Timur Rudoselsky - Noravank
 Tenton Yenne - Noravank
 Sergei Orlov - Noravank
 Mikhail Bashilov - Noravank
 Artur Sokhiyev - Noravank
 Claudir - Sevan
 Babou Cham - Sevan
 Artur Miranyan - Urartu
 Hakob Hakobyan - Urartu
 Uguchukwu Iwu - Urartu
 Aleksandr Stepanov - Van

Own goals:

See also
 2021–22 Armenian Premier League
 2021–22 Armenian First League

References

External links
 FFA

Armenian Cup seasons
Armenian Cup
Cup